Juan Larrea may refer to:

Juan Larrea (poet) (1895–1980), Spanish poet
Juan Larrea (politician) (1782–1847), Argentine politician
Juan Larrea (fencer) (born 1935), Argentine fencer
Juan Larrea (footballer) (born 1993), Argentine footballer
Juan Ignacio Larrea Holguín (1927–2006), Ecuadorian lawyer